The Small Business Health Care tax credit is a United States tax credit available to small employers who pay health insurance premiums on behalf of employees enrolled in a qualified health plan offered through a Small Business Health Options Program (SHOP) Marketplace. Employers who purchase health insurance through the program may get a tax credit of up to 50% of their premium contributions.

Tax credit terms
However, the small-business health care tax credit via Form 8941 is available only to businesses that meet certain standards. Firstly, employers have fewer than 25 employees. Secondly, their employee salary must be less than an average of $50,000. Thirdly, employer must pay at least 50% of the full-time employee's premium costs. However, employers are not required to offer coverage to part-time employees (work fewer than 30 works/week) or dependents, or to seasonal workers  who aren't considered full-time employees unless they work more than 120 days during the tax year. Lastly, the coverage to those full-employment must be offered through SHOP Marketplace.

There are employees who are excluded from this arrangement, such as partners or owners of more than 5% of the business and family members.

After 2014, small business owners can only claim the credit for two consecutive years in a row. After this they are no longer eligible to claim this credit.

Employers should apply to receive this tax credit on the annual business tax return. The tax credit is highest in particularly for small companies with fewer than 10 employees, with an average annual salary of $25,000 or less.

For instance, if there are 10 employees with total wage of $250,000, employer will receive a tax credit amount of $35,000 as they contribute at least $70,000 to their premiums.

References

External links
 

Tax credits
tax credits
Taxation in the United States
tax credit